International Velvet is a 1978 American film and a sequel to the 1944 picture National Velvet starring Tatum O'Neal, Christopher Plummer, Anthony Hopkins and Nanette Newman, and directed by Bryan Forbes. The film received mixed reviews. International Velvet was partly filmed at Birmingham University, England.

Plot
After her parents are killed in a car crash, teenage Sarah Velvet Brown is forced to leave her home in Cave Creek, Arizona, to go to England to live with her aunt Velvet Brown and Velvet's boyfriend John. After the events of National Velvet Donald got married, had Sarah, and moved from England to Arizona.

When Velvet was a similar age to Sarah, she and her horse, The Pie, entered the legendary Grand National horse race and crossed the finish line first; however, Velvet and The Pie were instantly disqualified because Velvet was a 14-year-old girl. The Pie is ultimately put out to stud upon his retirement. He sires his last foal after Sarah's arrival in England. Sarah and Velvet are present for the birth of this foal and Sarah eventually decides that she'd like to purchase him. She later finds out that Velvet has bought him for her. Sarah aptly names him Arizona Pie.

She shows enough talent to be selected for the British Olympic team, where she is the junior, but she does well under the stern guidance of Captain Johnson. Sarah lives up to her dream and enters the Olympic Three Day Event helping Great Britain win the team competition. She falls in love with an American competitor named Scott Saunders and moves back to America with him. At the conclusion of the film, Sarah is married to Scott, and she gives her Olympic gold medal to Velvet when she returns to England to visit and introduces Scott to Velvet and John.

Cast

 Tatum O'Neal as Sarah Velvet Brown 
 Christopher Plummer as John Seaton 
 Anthony Hopkins as Captain Johnson 
 Nanette Newman as Velvet Brown 
 Peter Barkworth as Pilot 
 Dinsdale Landen as Mr. Curtis 
 Sarah Bullen as Beth 
 Jeffrey Byron as Scott Saunders 
 Richard Warwick as Tim 
 Daniel Abineri as Wilson 
 Jason White as Roger 
 Martin Neil as Mike 
 Douglas Reith as Howard 
 Dennis Blanch as Policeman 
 Norman Wooland as Team Doctor 
 Susan Jameson as T.V. Interviewer 
 Brenda Cowling as Alice
 David Tate as Commentator

Production
It was the first film shot in England financed by MGM since 1971.

The majority of the countryside riding and home scenes were filmed in and around the Flete Estate in South Devon, including Mothecombe Beach and the nearby village of Holbeton.

The Cross-Country riding sequences were filmed in the grounds of Burghley House near Stamford, Lincolnshire.

Release
International Velvet was released in New York and Los Angeles on July 19, 1978.

Bryan Forbes's novelization of International Velvet was published to coincide with the film's release.

References

External links 
 
 
 
 
 
 

1978 films
1978 drama films
American drama films
American sequel films
Films about horses
Films based on British novels
Films directed by Bryan Forbes
American horse racing films
Films about the Summer Olympics
Films about Olympic equestrian sports
Metro-Goldwyn-Mayer films
Films shot at Pinewood Studios
Films scored by Francis Lai
Films shot in Greater Manchester
1970s English-language films
1970s American films